A meat grinder is a culinary tool for grinding (finely shredding into bits) meat.

Meat grinder may also refer to:

Meat Grinder, 2009 Thai horror film
"Meat Grinder," a song by Madvillain from their album Madvillainy
Saddam Hussein's alleged shredder, described as a meat grinder for people
Battles of Rzhev during the World War II, nicknamed the "meat-grinder" by veterans and historians
Operation Killer during the Korean War, nicknamed the "meat-grinder" by popular press for carnage experienced by Chinese forces